Chua Boon Huat (3 May 1980 – 1 August 2013) was a field hockey player from Bukit Cina, Malacca, Malaysia. Boon Huat was one of the longest serving hockey players in Malaysia.

Career

Club
He was with Kuala Lumpur Hockey Club for 10 years and part of 'the double' winners for three consecutive seasons.

In April 2002 Boon Huat take up an offer to play in the German League. During his stint, he did not disappoint his club, Red And White Munich. During his three-month stint in Germany, Boon Huat scored seven goals in nine matches, all field goals.

In 2005 he joined English Hockey League's Premier Division, Teddington Hockey Club.

His last overseas stint was in New Zealand in 2008, when he played for the Auckland club.

International
Under Paul Lissek, he made his debut as a 17-year-old with the Malaysia hockey team in the 1998 Commonwealth Games.
Boon Huat who had more than 321 caps for Malaysia had played in major competitions such as the World Cup, Olympics, Champions Trophy, Commonwealth Games, Asian Games and the Asia Cup. He was also the skipper of the 2001 National Junior team which featured in the Junior World Cup in Hobart.

Death
He died in a car accident involving his car and a truck watering plants at 2.25am on 1 August 2013. The incident occurred on the Damansara–Puchong Expressway (LDP) near Kelana Jaya LRT  station.

References

External links

 

1980 births
2013 deaths
People from Malacca
Malaysian sportspeople of Chinese descent
Peranakan people in Malaysia
Male field hockey defenders
Male field hockey midfielders
Male field hockey forwards
Malaysian male field hockey players
Olympic field hockey players of Malaysia
Field hockey players at the 2000 Summer Olympics
2002 Men's Hockey World Cup players
Commonwealth Games medallists in field hockey
Commonwealth Games silver medallists for Malaysia
Commonwealth Games bronze medallists for Malaysia
Asian Games medalists in field hockey
Asian Games bronze medalists for Malaysia
Medalists at the 2002 Asian Games
Field hockey players at the 2002 Asian Games
Field hockey players at the 2006 Asian Games
Field hockey players at the 1998 Commonwealth Games
Field hockey players at the 2006 Commonwealth Games
Expatriate field hockey players
Teddington Hockey Club players
Malaysian expatriates in England
Road incident deaths in Malaysia
Medallists at the 1998 Commonwealth Games
Medallists at the 2006 Commonwealth Games